Elections for the House of Representatives of the Philippines were held on November 11, 1941, with the ruling Nacionalista Party retaining a majority of the seats. Still, the party was prevented a clean sweep when three independents were elected. The elected congressmen were supposed to serve from December 30, 1941, to December 30, 1945, but World War II broke out and Imperial Japan invaded the Philippines on December 8, 1941, setting up a puppet Second Philippine Republic which then organized the National Assembly of the Second Philippine Republic, whose members were elected in 1943.

The Philippines was liberated by the Allied Powers in 1945 and the acts of the Second Republic were nullified; elected representatives who survived the war and were not interned for collaboration with the Japanese served until those who won in elections that were held in 1946 took office.

Results

See also
1st Congress of the Commonwealth of the Philippines

References

  
 

1941
History of the Philippines (1898–1946)
1941 elections in the Philippines